Cecilville (Karuk: íshirak) is a small unincorporated community in Siskiyou County, California, United States. It is on the south fork of the Salmon River and was established when the area was settled by miners during the Gold Rush. The community was named for a prospector. It was formerly in Klamath County before that county was dissolved and the part of that county, including Cecilville, was annexed by Siskiyou County.

Climate

References 

Settlements formerly in Klamath County, California
Unincorporated communities in California
Unincorporated communities in Siskiyou County, California